The Castle of Guarda is a medieval castle in the civil parish of Guarda, municipality of Guarda, the Portuguese district of the same name. 

It is classified as a National Monument.

Guarda
National monuments in Guarda District
Guarda
Buildings and structures in Guarda, Portugal